Jessie Catherine Couvreur (pseudonym Tasma) (28 October 1848 – 23 October 1897) was an Australian novelist.

Life
Jessie Catherine Couvreur was born at Highgate, London. Her father, Alfred James Huybers, came originally from Antwerp, and his daughter was of Dutch, French and English descent. She arrived in Tasmania with her parents in December 1852 and was educated at Hobart. In June 1867 she was married to Charles F. Fraser and went to live in Melbourne. The marriage was unfortunate, and was dissolved on the petition of the wife in December 1883 on grounds of adultery and desertion of more than two years. In 1873 she visited Europe, and between 1879 and 1883 spent much time there giving courses of lectures in French at various European cities. She also wrote for the Nouvelle Revue and received from the French government the decoration of Officier d'Académie. She revisited Tasmania but returned in 1883 to live permanently in Europe. In 1885 she married Auguste Couvreur, a well-known Belgian politician and publicist.

At sixteen years of age, Madame Couvreur, then Miss Huybers, had verses accepted by the Australian Journal, and she afterwards contributed essays and short stories to the Australasian and the Melbourne Review. Her first novel, Uncle Piper of Piper's Hill, appeared serially in the Australian Journal in 1888, and was published in London in 1889 under the pseudonym of Tasma. It had an immediate success and was followed by In her Earliest Youth (1890), A Sydney Sovereign and other Tales (1890), The Penance of Portia James (1891), A Knight of the White Feather (1892), Not Counting the Cost (1895), and A Fiery Ordeal (1897).

Couvreur's husband died in 1894 and Madame Couvreur took up his duties as correspondent of The Times at Brussels. She proved to be "a conscientious painstaking journalist, keenly alive to all political, intellectual and social movements". She continued to hold this position until her death on 23 October 1897.

Madame Couvreur was regarded as tall and handsome, with a highly cultivated mind. Her first book, Uncle Piper of Piper's Hill, was her best. There is not much plot, but there is excellent character-drawing and the interest is well-sustained to the end. Of her other novels In her Earliest Youth and The Penance of Portia James are possibly the best.

Publications

Novels and collection
 Uncle Piper of Piper's Hill (1888)
 A Sydney Sovereign (1890)
 In her Earliest Youth (1890)
 The Penance of Portia James (1891)
 A Knight of the White Feather (1892)
 Not Counting the Cost (1895)
 A Fiery Ordeal (1897)

Stories and articles
 Barren Love in Garnet Walch's Annual (1877) and later in A Sydney Sovereign
 Sick unto Death (Ch. 23) in The Fate of Fenella (1891)
 An Old Time Episode in Tasmania, in Mrs. Patchett Martin's Cooëe.

References

Further reading
 Clarke, Patricia. Tasma: The Life Of Jessie Couvreur, Allen & Unwin, 1994,

External links
 
 
  (1)
 Works by Tasma at Internet Archive (12)
 
 

1848 births
1897 deaths
19th-century Australian novelists
Australian women novelists
Australian people of Dutch descent
Australian people of Flemish descent
Australian people of French descent
Writers from Tasmania
The Times people
19th-century Australian women writers
19th-century Australian journalists
Pseudonymous women writers
English emigrants to colonial Australia
19th-century pseudonymous writers